El-Tetsh Stadium is Al Ahly’s current training stadium and one of Al Ahly SC club's sections that represent the club in Egypt and internationally. Although the game of football was not one of the goals of the founders of Al Ahly club the goal of the club was opening its doors to students of higher schools to meet and practice political dialogues, but the graduates of high schools members of the club have fallen in love with football, which prompted Ahly to build the first stadium in 1909 and they used to call it the time (Al-Hawsh), which is a colloquial word from Egyptian dialect means the courtyard in Arabic. The stadium was developed over the years to be Mokhtar El-Tetsh Stadium. Currently the stadium hold the team training and friendly games.

History
 In 1917 Al Ahly decided to build their own stadium.
 In 1927 Al Ahly added a western stand to the stadium.
 Mokhtar El-Tetch Stadium is a multi-purpose stadium in Cairo, Egypt. It is currently used mostly for football matches and was the home of Al Ahly before they moved to Cairo International Stadium because of the small capacity.
 The stadium was named after club legend Mahmoud Mokhtar El-Tetsh. It is currently used as a training ground for Al-Ahly and also for friendlies.
The stadium was developed over the years to become known as Mokhtar El-Tetsh Stadium. In 1929, the stadium was named after Egypt's prince at this time, the Prince Farouk Stadium. By 1956, light stands were added to the stadium. Later the stadium was named Mokhtar El Tetsh Stadium, Mokhtar El Tetsh was one of the club legends and was considered to be one of the most talented footballers in the country's history and attracted the hearts of many of his countrymen. Al Ahly continued to play their home games at Mokhtar El-Tetsh Stadium until Cairo Stadium was opened.

The Names of the Stadium
 The first time Al Ahly built the stadium its name was Al Ahly Stadium
 In 1928 after the monarchy sponsored Al Ahly during the reign of King Fuad, Al Ahly change the name of the stadium to Prince Farouk Stadium
 On 21 February 1965 after the death of Mahmoud Mokhtar El-Tetsh, Al Ahly decided to rename the stadium under the name of Mokhtar El-Tetch Stadium and it still founded till now
 Conclusion of the Names

1959 Africa Cup of Nations
The stadium was the only venue for the 1959 Africa Cup of Nations.

The following matches were played at the stadium during the 1959 Africa Cup of Nations:

Mokhtar El-Tetch Stadium Renewal Stages
 in 2009 Al Ahly Chairman Hassan Hamdy decided to renew the western stand after demolishing it and relaunched again in its new shape in 2010
 in 2016 Al Ahly Chairman Mahmoud Taher in collaboration with of Sela Sport Company, they renewal the western stand again and add the team color on the stand
 in 2021 Al Ahly Chairman Mahmoud El Khatib renewed the Eastern stand and added the photos and names of the 72 ultras Ahlawy victims of the Port Said Stadium riot on it.

References

External links
Mokhtar El-Tetsh Stadium
Mokhtar El-Tetsh Stadium "Stadium DB"

Football venues in Egypt
Stadiums in Cairo
Multi-purpose stadiums in Egypt
Football in Cairo